Imogolite is an aluminium silicate clay mineral with the chemical formula . It occurs in soils formed from volcanic ash and was first described in 1962 for an occurrence in Uemura, Kumamoto prefecture, Kyushu Region, Japan. Its name originates from the Japanese word , which refers to the brownish yellow soil derived from volcanic ash. It occurs together with allophane, quartz, cristobalite, gibbsite, vermiculite and limonite.

Imogolite consists of a network of nanotubes with an outer diameter of ca. 2 nm and an inner diameter of ca. 1 nm. The tube walls are formed by continuous  (gibbsite) sheets and orthosilicate anions ( groups). Owing to its tubular structure, natural availability, and low toxicity, imogolite has potential applications in polymer composites, fuel gas storage, absorbents, and as a catalyst support in chemical catalysis.

References

Further reading 
 
  
  (Contains structure illustration)

Aluminium minerals
Pedology
Phyllosilicates
Soil
Tetragonal minerals
Volcanic soils